Heliamphora nutans (Latin: nutans = nodding) is a species of marsh pitcher plant native to the border area between Venezuela, Brazil and Guyana, where it grows on several tepuis, including Roraima, Kukenán, Yuruaní, Maringma, and Wei Assipu. Heliamphora nutans was the first Heliamphora to be described and is the best known species.

Heliamphora nutans was originally discovered in 1839 on Mount Roraima by the two brothers Robert and Richard Schomburgk, although they did not collect samples to return to Europe. The plant was formally described by George Bentham in 1840, becoming the type species of the genus. In 1881, David Burke was plant-hunting in the same area of British Guiana where he collected specimens of the plant and introduced it to England.

This species employs an 'aquaplaning' trapping mechanism similar to that of many tropical pitcher plants of the genus Nepenthes.

References

Further reading

 Adlassnig, W., K. Pranji, E. Mayer, G. Steinhauser, F. Hejjas & I.K. Lichtscheidl (2010). The abiotic environment of Heliamphora nutans (Sarraceniaceae): pedological and microclimatic observations on Roraima Tepui. Brazilian Archives of Biology and Technology 53(2): 425–430. 
 Barrera, R., D. Fish & C.E. Machado-Allison (1989). Ecological patterns of aquatic insect communities in two Heliamphora pitcher-plant species of the Venezuelan highlands. Ecotropicos 2(1): 31–44. 
  Brewer-Carías, C. (2012).  Río Verde 8: 77–94. 
 Fleischmann, A., A. Wistuba & S. McPherson (21 December 2007). Drosera solaris (Droseraceae), a new sundew from the Guayana Highlands. Willdenowia 37(2): 551–555. 
 Gonzalez, J.M., K. Jaffe & F. Michelangeli (December 1991). Competition for prey between the carnivorous Bromeliaceae Brocchinia reducta and Sarraceneacea Heliamphora nutans. Biotropica 23(4B): 602–604. 
 Joel, D.M., B.E. Juniper & A. Dafni (December 1985). Ultraviolet patterns in the traps of carnivorous plants. New Phytologist 101(4): 585–593. 
 Kelloff, C.L., S.N. Alexander, V.A. Funk & H.D. Clarke (2011). Smithsonian Plant Collections, Guyana: 1995–2004, H. David Clarke. Smithsonian Contributions to Botany 97: i–viii, 1–307. 
 Kok, P.J.R. (20 October 2008). A new highland species of Arthrosaura Boulenger, 1885 (Squamata: Gymnophthalmidae) from Maringma tepui on the border of Guyana and Brazil. Zootaxa 1909: 1–15. []
 Lindley, J. (1846). Order CLV. Sarraceniaceæ.—Sarraceniads. In: The Vegetable Kingdom; or, The Structure, Classification, and Uses of Plants, Illustrated upon the Natural System. Bradbury & Evans, London. p. 429.
 McPherson, S. (2007). Pitcher Plants of the Americas. The McDonald & Woodward Publishing Company, Blacksburg, Virginia.
 Nerz, J. (December 2004). Heliamphora elongata (Sarraceniaceae), a new species from Ilu-Tepui. Carnivorous Plant Newsletter 33(4): 111–116.
 Steyermark, J.A. et al. (18 May 1951). Sarraceniaceae. [pp. 239–242] In: Contributions to the flora of Venezuela. Botanical exploration in Venezuela - 1. Fieldiana: Botany 28(1): 1–242.
 Wistuba, A., T. Carow & P. Harbarth (September 2002). Heliamphora chimantensis, a new species of Heliamphora (Sarraceniaceae) from the ‘Macizo de Chimanta’ in the south of Venezuela. Carnivorous Plant Newsletter 31(3): 78–82.
 Journal of Venezuela Expedition January/February 2006 by D. Bruce Means. Journals: D. Bruce Means, PhD. 

nutans
Flora of Venezuela 
Flora of Brazil
Flora of Guyana
Flora of the Tepuis